Phool Maya Kyapchhaki (born November 24, 1980 in  Janakpur, Dhanusa District) is a Nepalese sport shooter. Kyapchhaki represented Nepal at the 2008 Summer Olympics in Beijing, where she competed for the women's 10 m air rifle. She placed forty-sixth out of forty-seven shooters in the qualifying rounds, with a score of 380 points.

References

External links
 
NBC 2008 Olympics profile

1980 births
Living people
People from Janakpur
Nepalese female sport shooters
Nepalese sportswomen
Olympic shooters of Nepal
Shooters at the 2006 Asian Games
Shooters at the 2008 Summer Olympics
Shooters at the 2014 Asian Games
Asian Games competitors for Nepal